In mathematics, the operator norm measures the "size" of certain linear operators by assigning each a real number called its . Formally, it is a norm defined on the space of bounded linear operators between two given normed vector spaces.

Introduction and definition 

Intuitively, the continuous operator  never increases the length of any vector by more than a factor of  Thus the image of a bounded set under a continuous operator is also bounded. Because of this property, the continuous linear operators are also known as bounded operators. 
In order to "measure the size" of  one can take the infimum of the numbers  such that the above inequality holds for all  
This number represents the maximum scalar factor by which  "lengthens" vectors. 

The infimum is attained as the set of all such  is closed, nonempty, and bounded from below.

Examples 

If we specifically choose the Euclidean norm on both  and  then the matrix norm given to a matrix  is the square root of the largest eigenvalue of the matrix  (where  denotes the conjugate transpose of ). 
This is equivalent to assigning the largest singular value of 

Passing to a typical infinite-dimensional example, consider the sequence space  which is an Lp space, defined by

This can be viewed as an infinite-dimensional analogue of the Euclidean space  
Now consider a bounded sequence  The sequence  is an element of the space  with a norm given by

Define an operator  by pointwise multiplication:

The operator  is bounded with operator norm

Equivalent definitions

Let  be a linear operator between normed spaces. The first four definitions are always equivalent, and if in addition  then they are all equivalent:

If  is bounded then 

and  

Importantly, a linear operator  is not, in general, guaranteed to achieve its norm  on the closed unit ball  meaning that there might not exist any vector  of norm  such that  (if such a vector does exist and if  then  would necessarily have unit norm ). R.C. James proved James's theorem in 1964, which states that a Banach space  is reflexive if and only if every bounded linear function  achieves its norm on the closed unit ball. 
It follows, in particular, that every non-reflexive Banach space has some bounded linear functional (a type of bounded linear operator) that does not achieve its norm on the closed unit ball.

Properties 

This means

The following inequality is an immediate consequence of the definition:

It follows from the definition that if a sequence of operators converges in operator norm, it converges uniformly on bounded sets.

Table of common operator norms 

By choosing different norms for the domain, used in computing , and the codomain, used in computing , we obtain different values for the operator norm. Some common operator norms are easy to calculate, and others are NP-hard. 
Except for the NP-hard norms, all these norms can be calculated in  operations (for an  matrix), with the exception of the  norm (which requires  operations for the exact answer, or fewer if you approximate it with the power method or Lanczos iterations).

The norm of the adjoint or transpose can be computed as follows. 
We have that for any  then  where  are Hölder conjugate to  that is,  and

Operators on a Hilbert space 

Suppose  is a real or complex Hilbert space. If  is a bounded linear operator, then we have

and

To see why equality may not always hold, consider the Jordan canonical form of a matrix in the finite-dimensional case. Because there are non-zero entries on the superdiagonal, equality may be violated. The quasinilpotent operators is one class of such examples. A nonzero quasinilpotent operator  has spectrum  So  while 

However, when a matrix  is normal, its Jordan canonical form is diagonal (up to unitary equivalence); this is the spectral theorem. In that case it is easy to see that

This formula can sometimes be used to compute the operator norm of a given bounded operator : define the Hermitian operator  determine its spectral radius, and take the square root to obtain the operator norm of 

For example, consider the Lp space  which is a Hilbert space. 

Then each  is a bounded operator with operator norm 1 and

But  is an uncountable set. 
One can compare this with the fact that the sequence space  is not separable.

The associative algebra of all bounded operators on a Hilbert space, together with the operator norm and the adjoint operation, yields a C*-algebra.

See also

Notes

References

 .
 
  
  

Functional analysis
Norms (mathematics)
Operator theory